Aji Kusuma (born 30 January 1999) is an Indonesian professional footballer who plays as a forward for Liga 1 club Persija Jakarta.

Club career

Persika Karawang
In 2017, Aji signed a one-year contract with Persika Karawang from Bali United Youth, he scored in a 3–2 lose against Japan U20 in a friendly match on 27 March 2018.

Persiba Balikpapan
He was signed for Persiba Balikpapan to play in Liga 2 in the 2019 season. Aji made his league debut on 22 June 2019 in a match against PSIM Yogyakarta at the Batakan Stadium, Balikpapan. He played the full 90 minutes in the won to Persis Solo four days later.

On 20 October 2021, Aji scored his first league goal for Persiba Balikpapan from header in a 1–2 win over Persewar Waropen at Tuah Pahoe Stadium.

Aji scored in 40th minutes and give assists to Faldi Ades Tama in Persiba's 3–2 lose over Putra Delta Sidoarjo on 11 September 2022. On 22 September, Aji scored a brace for the club against Kalteng Putra, with a 5–0 victory, brought Persiba Balikpapan to 3rd place East Group.

On 12 January 2023, Persiba's management announced that Aji had officially left the club, because he had received an offer from a high-level indonesian Liga 1 club, he contributed with 6 appearances, and 3 goals during with Persiba Balikpapan for 2022 season.

Persija Jakarta
On 12 January 2023, Aji signed a one-year contract with Liga 1 club Persija Jakarta from Persiba Balikpapan. Three days later, Aji made his league debut for the club in a 3–2 win against Bali United, coming on as a substituted Ginanjar Wahyu. Aji scored his first league goals in a 4–2 home win over PSM Makassar, scoring a brace, on 25 January.

International career
On 25 March 2018, Aji made his debut for Indonesia U20 against Japan U20, also scored his first international goal for national team in a 4–1 lose in a friendly match. On 1 July 2018, it was reported that Aji received a call-up from the Indonesia U20 for 2018 AFF U-19 Youth Championship. On 9 July 2018, playing as a starting in a 2–1 lose against Thailand U20, in the AFF U-19 Youth Championship.

Career statistics

Club

References

External links
 Aji Kusuma at Soccerway
 Aji Kusuma at Liga Indonesia

1999 births
Living people
Sportspeople from Riau
Indonesian footballers
Persiba Balikpapan players
Persija Jakarta players
Liga 2 (Indonesia) players
Liga 1 (Indonesia) players
Indonesia youth international footballers
Association football forwards